Chris Robert Rumbiak (born June 24, 2001) is an Indonesian professional footballer who plays as a right winger for Liga 1 club Barito Putera.

Club career

Barito Putera
He was signed for Barito Putera to play in Liga 1 in the 2021 season. Rumbiak made his professional debut on 11 September 2021 in a match against Bali United at the Indomilk Arena, Tangerang.

Career statistics

Club

Notes

References

External links
 Chris Rumbiak at Soccerway
 Chris Rumbiak at Liga Indonesia

2001 births
People from Biak Numfor Regency
Living people
Indonesian footballers
PS Barito Putera players
Association football midfielders
Sportspeople from Papua